The Martin House is a historic house located at 144 E. Main Cross St. in Greenville, Kentucky. The house was built in 1870 by the Brank family, whose 1840 house at the same site had burned down that year. The home initially had an Italianate design which featured decorative bracketing beneath its eaves. Tobacco merchant Rufus Martin bought the house in 1899, and he and his son remodeled it in the following decade. Martin's additions were mainly done in the Colonial Revival style and included a front porch supported by Tuscan columns. After Martin died in 1902, his son inherited the house; as of the 1980s, the home remained in his family.

The house was added to the National Register of Historic Places on August 15, 1985.

References

External links

Houses on the National Register of Historic Places in Kentucky
Italianate architecture in Kentucky
Colonial Revival architecture in Kentucky
Houses completed in 1870
Houses in Muhlenberg County, Kentucky
National Register of Historic Places in Muhlenberg County, Kentucky
1870 establishments in Kentucky
Greenville, Kentucky
Demolished buildings and structures in Kentucky
Demolished but still listed on the National Register of Historic Places